Parliamentary elections were held in Romania on 2 March 1969. The Front of Socialist Unity, which had been formed a year earlier to replace the People's Democratic Front, was the only organization that contested the election; no prospective candidate could run for office without the Front's approval.  Like the People's Democratic Front, the Front of Socialist Unity was dominated by the Romanian Communist Party. The Front won all 465 seats in the Great National Assembly.

Electoral system
These were the first elections held under the 1965 constitution. Candidates were elected in single member constituencies, and had to receive over 50% of the vote. If no candidate passed this threshold, or if voter turnout in the constituency was less than 50%, re-runs were held until the requirements were met. Voters had the option of voting against the Front candidates.

Results

References

Parliamentary elections in Romania
Romania
1969 in Romania
One-party elections
March 1969 events in Europe
1969 elections in Romania